Baldwin Hall, also known as the Cross Roads Church, was built as the  Severn Crossroads Methodist Episcopal Church and is currently a historic church at Millersville, Anne Arundel County, Maryland.  It is a one-story gable-front frame structure in the Italianate and Carpenter Gothic-styles built in 1861.  It was moved about 1930 and again in 1981.  An addition, constructed about 1933, duplicates the exterior detailing of the original part.  It is currently operated by the Severn Cross Roads Foundation, Inc., as a wedding and banquet facility known as Historic Baldwin Hall.

It was listed on the National Register of Historic Places in 1983.

References

External links
, including photo from 1997, at Maryland Historical Trust
The Historical Marker Database website entry
Severn Cross Roads Foundation, Inc. website

Churches on the National Register of Historic Places in Maryland
Carpenter Gothic church buildings in Maryland
Churches in Anne Arundel County, Maryland
Churches completed in 1861
19th-century Methodist church buildings in the United States
Italianate architecture in Maryland
Methodist churches in Maryland
1861 establishments in Maryland
National Register of Historic Places in Anne Arundel County, Maryland
Methodist Episcopal churches in the United States
Italianate church buildings in the United States